is a 1988 episodic Japanese film directed by Eriko Watanabe, Tetsuya Nakashima, Takahito Hara and Yukihiko Tsutsumi.

Awards and nominations
13th Hochi Film Award 
 Won: Best Actress - Narumi Yasuda

References

1988 films
1980s Japanese-language films
Films directed by Tetsuya Nakashima
1980s Japanese films